Karghesh-e Olya (also Romanized as Kārghesh-e ‘Olyā; also known as Kārghesh-e Bālā) is a village in Sefid Sang Rural District, Qalandarabad District, Fariman County, Razavi Khorasan Province, Iran. At the 2006 census, its population was 131, in 33 families.

References 

Populated places in Fariman County